Jonathan Christopher McDowell (born 1960) is an astronomer and astrophysicist at the Harvard–Smithsonian Center for Astrophysics. He is a staff member at the Chandra X-ray Center. McDowell is the author and editor of Jonathan's Space Report, an e-mail-distributed newsletter documenting satellite launches.

Education and career

McDowell has a BA in Mathematics (1981) from Churchill College and a PhD in Astrophysics (1986) from the Institute of Astronomy, both at the University of Cambridge, England. After high school, McDowell worked for six months at the Royal Observatory, Greenwich and held a summer job at the Royal Observatory, Edinburgh before he began his PhD studies. His first post-doctoral position was at Jodrell Bank followed by another at the Center for Astrophysics  Harvard & Smithsonian in Cambridge, Massachusetts. McDowell then moved to Huntsville, Alabama, where he spent a year at NASA's Marshall Space Flight Center. In 1992, McDowell returned to Cambridge, Massachusetts, and currently works there as a staff member at the Chandra X-ray Center.

Research interests

McDowell's main research interests include:
 the cosmological microwave background
 the X-ray emission from the merging galaxy Arp 220
 the nature of the broad emission line region in quasars
 the broad-band spectral energy distribution in quasars
 studying nearby galaxies with the Chandra X-ray Observatory

In software, McDowell helped design the CIAO data analysis package and the software infrastructure for the Chandra X-ray Observatory data processing pipelines. More recently, McDowell led the creation of an exhibit of astronomical images at the Smithsonian. He is co-director of an undergraduate summer research program whose alumni include Alicia M. Soderberg and Planet Hunters scientist Megan Schwamb .

Jonathan's Space Report

In his free time, McDowell conducts research into the history of spaceflight, and since 1989 has written and edited Jonathan's Space Report, a free internet newsletter documenting technical details on satellite launches. This information, obtained from original sources including declassified Department of Defense documents and Russian-language publications, can also be found on McDowell's web site.

In 1994, McDowell published a history of the North American X-15 spaceplane, in which he suggested that 80 km should be adopted as the boundary of space.  In the mesosphere, 80 km is nearly equal to 50 mi, the altitude used by the United States to confer astronaut status on pilots, as in the X-15 program itself.  It also differs from the internationally accepted Kármán line altitude of 100 km, used by the Fédération Aéronautique Internationale for the same purpose.  In 2018 McDowell published a refereed journal paper in Acta Astronautica making detailed physical arguments for the 80 km value.

Media

In 2017, McDowell weighed in on footage released by the DOD showing a UFO on the website  Inverse, though stating he had not reviewed the case in question:
Typically, the explanation is that the thing they are looking at is much closer or much farther than they thought, or is a reflection of some kind,

From 1993 to 2010, McDowell wrote a monthly column for Sky and Telescope. In addition, McDowell has been interviewed on numerous television and radio programs with regard to rocket launches or other celestial phenomena that generated interest amongst the general public.

Honours 
He was elected a Legacy Fellow of the American Astronomical Society in 2020.

The main-belt asteroid 4589 McDowell was named after him in 1993.

Activism

In addition to his astronomical activities, McDowell has been engaged in progressive activism, for example Planned Parenthood, and other social endeavors such as promoting skepticism and atheism.

References

External links 
 https://www.planet4589.org

1960 births
Living people
Alumni of Churchill College, Cambridge
21st-century British astronomers
People educated at King's College School, London
Fellows of the American Astronomical Society
20th-century British astronomers